Michael Reeves Deland (December 13, 1941 – January 8, 2018) was an American lawyer, government official and environmental consultant. He was appointed Chair of the Council on Environmental Quality by United States President George H. W. Bush in 1989.

From 1983 to 1992 Deland was the Regional Administrator for New England at the U.S. Environmental Protection Agency (EPA). As the head of EPA's office in Boston he led the agency's efforts in the 1980s to clean up Boston Harbor, and worked to protect wetlands areas in New England.

Deland graduated from Harvard University in 1963, served in the U.S. Navy and obtained his law degree from Boston College Law School in 1969. He first joined EPA in 1971, and later worked as an environmental consultant from 1976 to 1983. He became chairman for the non-profit group National Organization on Disability in 2001, until his retirement in 2007.

References

1941 births
2018 deaths
20th-century American lawyers
Boston College Law School alumni
George H. W. Bush administration personnel
Harvard College alumni
Massachusetts lawyers
People of the United States Environmental Protection Agency